The Longstaff Prize is given to a member of the Royal Society of Chemistry who has done the most to advance the science of chemistry. First awarded in 1881, it was originally conferred by the Chemical Society and known as the Longstaff Medal.

Winners
Source:

See also

 List of chemistry awards

References

Awards of the Royal Society of Chemistry